The Diploma of the Verkhovna Rada of Ukraine is an award of the Verkhovna Rada of Ukraine for significant contribution to any sphere of state life, outstanding socio-political activity, merits to the Ukrainian people in promoting and strengthening Ukraine as a democratic, social, legal state, implementation of rights and freedoms of citizens, development of democracy, parliamentarism and civil harmony in society, and finally, active participation in legislative activities.

Laureates
All About Accounting
Rustam Akhmetov
Oleksandr Abdullin
Volodymyr Biletskyy
Oleh Bilorus
Epiphanius I of Ukraine
Vasyl Grytsak
K. D. Ushinsky South Ukrainian National Pedagogical University
Anatoli Ljutjuk
Volodymyr Malyshev
Oleh Musiy
Boris Muzalev
Oleh Nemchinov
Viktor Ostapchuk
Oleg Shapovalov
Oleksandr Sydorenko
Mykola Tochytskyi
Evgeniy Udod
Leonid Burlachuk

References

Awards of the Verkhovna Rada of Ukraine
Laureates of the Diploma of the Verkhovna Rada of Ukraine
Badges
Ukrainian awards